À propos de Sarajevo is a 2005 documentary short film written and directed by Haris Pašović. It is the story about a Sarajevo festival led by Edin Zubcevic and the city of Sarajevo which, despite four years of the brutal siege of Sarajevo, still nourishes multiculturalism and love of jazz music. The documentary is 30 minutes long and features E.S.T., Denis Baptist, Bojan Zulfikarpašić Trio, Dhafer Yousuf, Anuar Brahem and several other European bands.

The documentary was screened at Sarajevo Film Festival (2005) and Bangkok International Film Festival (2006).

References

External links
 

2005 short documentary films
2005 films
2005 in Bosnia and Herzegovina
Documentary films about music festivals
Documentary films about jazz music and musicians
Films set in Sarajevo
Festivals in Sarajevo